Van Phillips may refer to:

Van Phillips (golfer) (born 1972), English golfer
Van Phillips (inventor) (born 1954), American inventor of prosthetics
Van Phillips (composer), composer for the 1950s British science fiction series Journey Into Space